Mikhail Reva (March 13, 1960) is a Ukrainian artist, sculptor, architect, jewelry craftsman, a founder of a non-profit organisation — REVA Foundation, a co-founder of a charitable organisation " Buduschee" ('The Future'), the Rehabilitation center for children named after Boris Litvak.

Biography 

Mikhail Reva was born on March 13, 1960, in Kerch (Crimea). In 1966 he moved with his parents to Odesa (Ukraine). After high school, he entered Odesa Higher Engineering Marine School and graduated in 1977. Then he served in the army (1980-1982). On his return to Odesa, he worked in the sculpture art fund, where he met his future wife Tatyana Kushniruk.  At the age of 25, Mikhail entered the Higher School of Art and Design named after V. Mukhina, St. Petersburg. 
His academic tutors were Lyudmila Pavlovna Kalugina, Anatoly Gordeevich Dyoma (sculpture), Peter Izrailevich Puko (painting), Igor Pavlovich Shmelev (architecture and design).

Michail Reva :"It was a happy time. The floodgate of information just started to open, and we were overwhelmed with a desire of creating our new "concord of the day", a new world. We were sitting till dawn talking about art, our souls were glowing in a sincere impulse. What a powerful aspiration it was - to work, to dream, to create...Today I remember that time as a time of hope, a time of discovery, of such an amazing thirst, that much as we reveled in art and in freedom, it was never enough. Five years of my student life passed in a blink of an eye. Trying to reminisce that time in detail, I recall all my Institute works. And everything else is remembered as one huge continuous cognitive moment. A moment, in which the entire Universe fell upon me!"

Michail Reva was graduated with summa cum laude in the field of architectural and decorative plastics in 1990. The Academy of Arts awarded him a scholarship and sent to Rome (Italy) to Villa Abamelec. On completion of his internship, he returned to Odesa. The fateful acquaintance with Ernst Neizvestny during the work of the monument "The Golden Child" (Mikhail made bas-reliefs "Four Sides of the World").

Mikhail was the creator of the "Angel of Grace" for the children's rehabilitation center "Future", founder of this unique complex was the famous Odesa activist Boris Davidovich Litvak. 
"Do not refuse good deeds when your hand is able to do it"  written on the bay window, under the gold angel.

The works of Michael Reva have a diverse nature and are presented in many central locations of Odesa, Ukraine. His art-objects have become a landmark of the city — a monument dedicated to I. Ilf and E. Petrov "The Twelfth Chair", "Love Tree", the fountain "Source of Life" next to Vorontsov Palace, art object "Odesa's Time" and many other works.

Activities 
 1984 Exhibition "Land and People" in the "Manege" Moscow, USSR.
 1985-1990 Studied at the Academy of Decorative and Applied Art and Design (until 1992 - Higher Art and Industrial School named after VN Mukhina). St. Petersburg.
 1986 Laureate of the competition to create the prize of the international film festival "Golden Duke", Odesa.
 1990 Received the Gold Medal of the Academy of Arts of the USSR for the best diploma in the field of architectural and decorative plastics.
 1991-1992 Internship at the Roman Academy of Arts, Italy.
 1992 Personal exhibition in the House of the Artist, Moscow, Russia.
 1993 Joined the National Union of Artists of Ukraine.
 1994 International exhibition of miniature sculptures, dedicated to Divine Comedy Dante. Ravenna Italy, participation in the UNESCO auction of UNICEF. Paris, France.
 1995 "Gateway to ..." - personal exhibition within the framework of the international conference dedicated to V.V. Kandinsky at Museum of Western and Eastern Arts, Odesa.
 1996 "Dreams of Montezuma" - personal exhibition within a framework of international project "Communication" Caracas, Venezuela.
 1997 Grand Prix of the International Festival of Arts "Golden Peretin" Kyiv, Ukraine.
 1998 The 3-rd Prize of the 110th International Biennial "Libr'Art" Libramont, Belgium.
 2000 Personal exhibition "Altar of children's dreams". Children's Rehabilitation Center, Odesa, Ukraine,
 2000 Participation in the exhibition "20 artists of Ukraine at the end of the 20th century". National Museum of Art, Kyiv.
 2001 Participation in the exhibition "Ten Years of Independence of Ukraine" at Ukrainian Institute of America in New York, USA.
 2003 Exhibition "Decorative and Applied Art of Ukraine of the ХХ century, 200 names". Ukrainian House, Kyiv
 2004 Awarded a title "The Honoured Artist of Ukraine" by the Ukrainian Government. 
 2005 Personal exhibition "7305". Museum of Western and Oriental art. Odesa, Ukraine.
 2007 Awarded the title of Professor of the Moscow Branch of the International Academy of Architecture MAAM, Russia
 2007 Laureate of the National Competition in Architecture "Creation", the first prize in the nomination "Public Interior" Odesa, Ukraine.
 2010 First prize in the international competition for the creation of the memorial and museum complex "Babi Yar" Kyiv, Ukraine.
 2013 The first prize in the international competition for the best idea for art installation in the atrium of the department store TSUM Kyiv, Ukraine.
 2014 Participation in the exhibition "Ukrainian Breakthrough" at the Center for Contemporary Art, Odesa.
 2015 Established Reva Foundation (Ukraine). 
 2017 Member of the Presidential Council World-Wide Club of Odessites.
 2018 Tender winner for creation a monument "Heroes of Heavenly Hundred", Odesa.
 2019 Winner of Jan Gelman Award for benefits and glory of Odesa, established by the Gentlemen's KVN team at Odesa University.

Basic works 
 1993 The fountain "Source of Life" dedicated to the 200th anniversary of Odesa
 1994-1995 Bas-reliefs "Four Sides of the World" to the monumental sculpture of Ernst Neizvestny "The Golden Child". Odesa.
 1996 "Angel of Grace" - a monumental sculpture, bronze with gilding, installed over the entrance to the rehabilitation center for disabled children, Odesa.
 1997 A complex of fountains on a biblical theme for the residence of the US ambassador to Kyiv, Ukraine. 
 1997 The project "Slavic shrines" for the National Treasury of Ukraine.
 1988,1990,1994 Design of "Grand Award" for the International Film Festival "Golden Duke". Odesa.
 1998 Peter Berg Prize "For overcoming the impossible", ordered by the National Geographic Society of Great Britain.
 1999 "The 12th chair", bronze park sculpture, installed in the Central Park of Odesa,
 1999 Competition project of monumental sculpture "Adam Apple" commissioned by the Amsterdam municipality, Holland.
 2001 Competition project of the monumental sculpture "Crystal Dream" for the public project "3 Acres on the Lake", Chicago, USA
 2003 Sculptures of the business center "Leonardo", Kyiv, Ukraine
 2005 Monument "In the memory of the victims of terrorism around the world" Kyiv, Ukraine
 2006 Sculptural composition "Tree of Love" Odesa
 2006 Sculptural composition "The Heart of the World" Children's Rehabilitation Center for Disabled Children, Odesa
 2007 Interior design of Intercontinental Hotel, Kyiv
 2007-2008 Sculpture "The Grain of Life" together with Angelo Farion (Moscow).
 2009 Concept of architectural project for the memorial and museum complex "Babi Yar" Kyiv, Ukraine
 2009 Fountain (bronze, golden leaf) in the atrium of Intercontinental Hotel, Kyiv
 2011 Project of the fountain, sculptural compositions and design of the Swisshotel Odessa Hotel
 2011 Architectural project of the monument Isaac Babel sculptor Georgiy Vartanovich Frangulyan, Odesa
 2012 The project "Trilogy of Grapevine" (bronze, gilding) for the "Wine Culture Center of Shabo", Odesa region
 2012 Sculptural composition "City-Center" (steel, paint) Odesa, Ukraine
 2013 Sculpture "Stones" (sheet iron, pebbles) 
 2013 Graphic project "Odessa series" (paper, ink)
 2014 Kinetic sculptural compositions (steel, plastic) the central avenue of Arcadia beach 
 2015 Park sculpture "Odessa's Time" 
 2016 The tomb of Bogdan Stupka (Kyiv)
 2017 Illustrations for Georgy Golubenko’s book “Odessa Decameron”
 2017 Sculpture "DOMUS SOLIS" on the beach Langeron, Odesa.
 2017 Sculpture Greek Memorial Sign 
 2018 Sculptural composition "Particles of Life" for the Odrex Medical House, Odesa.
 2018 Fountain "Origin of Inception" Greek Park, Odesa.
 2018 Violin Soul Prize for The International Pedagogy Award of Honor 2018 Foundation Sion Violin Music -Switzerland
 2019 Prize for the IX International festival of clowns and mimes “Comedyad-2019”
 2019 Sculpture "More books, less fear", Odesa National Scientific Library.

Gallery

References

External links 
 RevaStudio
 REVA Foundation Ltd.
 Behance 
 Press
 Interview in Odessa Review

Male sculptors
1960 births
Living people
People from Kerch
Ukrainian sculptors
Ukrainian architects
Ukrainian male sculptors